Safad El Battikh, is a village in Nabatiye Governorate, in the Bint Jbeil District of southern Lebanon, about  from Beirut. The village is situated in the north eastern outskirts of the town of Tebnine, in the heart of the Lebanese Shia Muslim community of Jabal Amel.

History

In the 1596 Ottoman tax records, the village, named  (same as today but some history books transliterate differently such as Safad al-Battih),  was located in the Ottoman nahiya (subdistrict) of  Tibnin  under the Liwa of Safad, with a population of 10 households and 2 bachelors, all Muslim. The villagers paid a fixed tax-rate of 25% on  agricultural products, such as wheat (1,300 akçe), barley (420 akçe),  fruit trees (380 akçe), goats and beehives (20 akçe), in addition to "occasional revenues" (80 akçe); a total of 2,200 akçe.

In 1856 it was named Safed on Kiepert's map of Palestine/Lebanon published that year, while in 1875, Victor Guérin passed by and noted: "to my left, on a high hill, the small village of Safed el-Bathikha, inhabited by both Métualis and Christians." 

In 1881, the PEF's Survey of Western Palestine (SWP)  described the village (which it called Safed el Battîkh): "A village, built of stone, containing about 100 Metawileh and fifty Christians, situated on hill-top, surrounded by arable land. The water supply is from several perennial springs and ten cisterns in the village."

Modern era
The current Bint Jbeil province was created in 1922 by French colonials.

In 2009, there were 125 members of the Lady of the Assumption parish of the Melkite Church in the village.

References

Bibliography

External links
Safed el Battîkh  on the Palestine Exploration Fund Map of 1878, Map 2:  IAA, Wikimedia commons
Safad El Battikh, Localiban

Populated places in Bint Jbeil District
Geography of Lebanon
Shia Muslim communities in Lebanon